The Draper Utah Temple is the 129th temple of the Church of Jesus Christ of Latter-day Saints. It was dedicated in sessions from March 20–22, 2009. Prior to the dedication, the temple was open to the public from January 15, 2009 through March 14, 2009.

History
The intent to construct the temple was announced by church president Gordon B. Hinckley during the opening session of the October 2004 general conference. Hinckley said the new building was needed to relieve overcrowding in other temples in the valley. The temple is the fourth temple in the Salt Lake Valley in addition to the Salt Lake, Jordan River, and Oquirrh Mountain temples.

Location and structure

The location near the mouth of Draper's Corner Canyon includes an Latter-day Saint meetinghouse. Many varieties of trees surround the temple and line the 492 parking spots.

Groundbreaking
The groundbreaking for the temple occurred during an invitation only ceremony at the site which was broadcast on the church's satellite system to nearby stake centers. The ceremony was conducted by Russell M. Nelson of the church's Quorum of the Twelve Apostles, with all members of the First Presidency in attendance.

Open house 

The church announced on November 29, 2008, that the temple would be open to the public for tours beginning January 15, 2009. Reservations for tours were available until March 14, 2009.

In 2020, like all the church's other temples, the Draper Utah Temple was closed in response to the coronavirus pandemic.

See also

Donald L. Staheli, first temple president
 The Church of Jesus Christ of Latter-day Saints in Utah
 Comparison of temples of The Church of Jesus Christ of Latter-day Saints
 List of temples of The Church of Jesus Christ of Latter-day Saints
 List of temples of The Church of Jesus Christ of Latter-day Saints by geographic region
 Temple architecture (Latter-day Saints)

References

External links
 
Draper Utah Temple Official site
Draper Utah Temple at ChurchofJesusChristTemples.org

21st-century Latter Day Saint temples
Religious buildings and structures in Salt Lake County, Utah
Religious buildings and structures completed in 2009
Temples (LDS Church) in Utah
2009 establishments in Utah
Buildings and structures in Draper, Utah